This article lists the political officers in the Kingdom of Sikkim from 1889 to 1975. Until 1947, political officers were British and acted as local representatives of the British Empire and British Raj. Following its independence in 1947, India continued to appoint its own political officers until 1975, when Sikkim became the 22nd state of India following a referendum. The officer also oversaw British trade agencies in Tibet.

List

(Dates in italics indicate de facto continuation of office)

See also
 Chogyal
 List of heads of government of the Kingdom of Sikkim
 Kingdom of Sikkim
 History of Sikkim

References

External links
 

Government of Sikkim
History of Sikkim